Michael Williams (born 1 December 1956) is a Welsh former professional footballer who played as a midfielder. He made 9 appearances in the English Football League with Wrexham and made appearances in the Welsh league with Bangor City.

References

1956 births
Living people
Welsh footballers
Association football midfielders
Wrexham A.F.C. players
Bangor City F.C. players
English Football League players